The women's 10 kilometres walk event at the 1997 Summer Universiade was held on 26 August on the streets of Catania, Italy.

Results

References

Athletics at the 1997 Summer Universiade
1997 in women's athletics
1997